Oussama Oueslati (born 24 March 1996) is a Tunisian taekwondo athlete. He represented Tunisia at the 2016 Summer Olympics in Rio de Janeiro and won a bronze medal in the men's 80 kg. He was the flag bearer for Tunisia in the closing ceremony.

References

External links

1996 births
Living people
Tunisian male taekwondo practitioners
Olympic taekwondo practitioners of Tunisia
Taekwondo practitioners at the 2016 Summer Olympics
Olympic bronze medalists for Tunisia
Medalists at the 2016 Summer Olympics
African Games silver medalists for Tunisia
African Games medalists in taekwondo
Mediterranean Games silver medalists for Tunisia
Mediterranean Games medalists in taekwondo
Competitors at the 2015 African Games
Competitors at the 2013 Mediterranean Games
21st-century Tunisian people